Val de Loir (May 7, 1959 – October 30, 1974) was a French Thoroughbred racehorse who won important races in France including the French Derby and was a Champion sire.

Val de Loir stood at Haras de Sassy in Saint-Christophe-le-Jajolet in Lower Normandy. He sired the Prix du Jockey Club winner Val de l'Orne, the Prix Saint-Alary winner Comtesse de Loir, the Grand Prix de Paris winners Chaparral (1969) and Tennyson (1973), the 1968 Epsom Oaks winner, La Lagune, the 1970 Gran Premio de Madrid winner, Ifniri, and the 1976 Irish Oaks and Prix Vermeille winner, Lagunette.

Among his other offspring, Val de Loir was the damsire of 1981 Epsom Derby winner Shergar, the 1983 Epsom Oaks winner, Sun Princess, and Green Dancer, winner of the 1975 French 2,000 Guineas and the Leading sire in France in 1991.

References
 search page for Val de Loir records at Thoroughbred Heritage

1959 racehorse births
1974 racehorse deaths
Racehorses bred in France
Racehorses trained in France
French Thoroughbred Classic Race winners
Champion Thoroughbred Sires of France
British Champion Thoroughbred broodmare sires
Thoroughbred family 5-h